The 1990 Grand Prix de Tennis de Lyon was a men's tennis tournament played on indoor carpet courts at the Palais des Sports de Gerland in Lyon, France, and was part of the World Series of the 1990 ATP Tour. It was the fourth edition of the tournament and took place from 15 October through 22 October 1990. Sixth-seeded Marc Rosset won the singles title.

Finals

Singles

 Marc Rosset defeated  Mats Wilander 6–3, 6–2
 It was Rosset's only title of the year and the 2nd of his career.

Doubles

 Patrick Galbraith /  Kelly Jones defeated  Jim Grabb /  David Pate 7–6, 6–4
 It was Galbraith's 2nd title of the year and the 3rd of his career. It was Jones' 4th title of the year and the 7th of his career.

References

External links
 ITF tournament edition details

Grand Prix de Tennis de Lyon
Open Sud de France
October 1990 sports events in Europe
Grand Prix de Tennis de Lyon